Port Isabel Slough was a deep slough in the Colorado River Delta near the mouth of the Colorado River during the 19th century, within the state of Sonora, Mexico.

History
Until the Great Flood of 1862, what became Port Isabel Slough was a shallow tidewater slough, but the extreme flood waters of that year cut its channel much deeper, so that at low tide it still was three fathoms deep. The slough was sheltered from the extremes of the tidal bore of the Colorado River and deep enough to prevent stranding on shoals or mud flats at low tide. This made it an ideal anchorage for maritime craft to load and unload their cargo and passengers from the steamboats that took them up and down river without the danger from the tides that they were having to risk in the estuary at Robinson's Landing.

In the month of March 1865, the schooner Isabel, from San Francisco, commanded by W. H. Pierson, found and entered this slough and discharged her cargo, to a steamboat there for the first time.  Subsequently, in June 1865, the Isabel and the brig Laura, unloaded cargoes there again, and the head of the George A. Johnson & Company, George Alonzo Johnson, and his manager Captain Issac Polhamus were there and saw the value of the waterway and named the slough for the Isabel.

Subsequently, the steamers and sailing ships and later ocean going steamships loaded and off loaded their cargoes there and the steamboat company established Port Isabel 2 1/2 miles above the mouth of the slough.  Three miles above Port Isabel was Shipyard Slough, another slough tributary to Port Isabel Slough which became the site of the company tidal dry dock and shipyard, as tidal conditions were ideal for flooding and draining the dry dock there.

In 1876, Captain Polhamus advertised for a company that would cut a channel for 5 miles from the Colorado River to Port Isabel Slough to cut the distance traveled by the steamers to the port.  However, the plan came to naught, when the Southern Pacific Railroad bought out the company and bridged the Colorado River at Yuma, Arizona in 1877.  Subsequently, the port supplanted by the rail-head at Yuma, was abandoned in 1878.

References

External links
 Schooner discharging cargo into what appears to be Barge No. 1 and the "Mohave I" at Port Isabel. from hdl.huntington.org accessed July 28, 2015 - Mohave I ran from 1864 to 1875, barges were towed by the Johnson Company boats from 1865.  These ships and barge are resting in Port Isabel Slough.

Colorado River
History of Sonora
Lower Colorado River Valley
Steamboat transport on the Colorado River